The G4 was a strengthened version of Honda's first 4-speed automatic transmission, the H4.  Introduced in 1986 on the new flagship Honda/Acura Legend, it was replaced by the updated MPYA.

Applications:
 1986–1987 Acura Legend (G4)
 1988–1989 Acura Legend (L5)
 1990 Acura Legend (PL5X)

See also
 List of Honda transmissions

G4
Automatic transmission tradenames